Psacothea is a genus of longhorn beetles of the subfamily Lamiinae, containing the following species:

 Psacothea hilaris (Pascoe, 1857) - yellow spotted longicorn beetle
 Psacothea nigrostigma Wang, Chiang & Zheng, 2002
 Psacothea rubra Gressitt, 1938

References

Lamiini